Myanmar (also known as Burma) is the northwesternmost country of mainland Southeast Asia located on the Indochinese peninsula. With an area of 261,228 sq mi (676,578 sq km), it is the second largest country in Southeast Asia and the largest on mainland Southeast Asia. The kite-shaped country stretches from 10'N to 20'N for 1,275 miles (2,050 km) with a long tail running along the western coast of the Malay Peninsula.

Myanmar lies along the Indian and Eurasian Plates, to the southeast of the Tibetan Plateau. To its west is the Bay of Bengal and to its south is the Andaman Sea. The country is nestled between several mountain ranges with the Arakan Mountains on the west and the Shan Plateau dominating the east. The central valley follows the Irrawaddy River, the most economically important river to the country with 39.5 million people, including the largest city Yangon, living within its basin. The country is home to many diverse ethnic groups, with 135 officially recognized groups. It is strategically located near major Indian Ocean shipping lanes and was historically home to overland trade routes into China from the Bay of Bengal. The neighboring countries are China, India, Bangladesh, Thailand and Laos.

Borders

Land 

The India-Myanmar border heads north through the Chin Hills towards the Tiau River.

The tripoint with China and India is disputed due to the Sino-Indian border dispute but lies de facto north of the Diphu Pass. The China-Myanmar border heads northeast to Hkakabo Razi just one mile west of its summit. It then turns southeast following the Hengduan and Gaoligong Mountains through many irregular lines towards the Taping River and Shweli River. It then heads south-eastwards across the far Shan Hills, following hills and rivers, until it reaches the Mekong river.

The Laos-Myanmar border runs entirely along the Mekong river from the tripoint with China the tripoint with Thailand at the confluence of the Kok and Mekon Rivers for 

The Myanmar-Thailand border follows the Kok River and Sai River briefly before continuing overland on a series of irregular lines southwards through the Daen Lao Range before heading southwest to the Salween River. The border follows the Salween and then the Moei River before going overland again through the Tenasserim Hills towards the Malay Peninsula. Near Prachuap Khiri Khan, the border comes within  to the Gulf of Thailand.

Maritime 
The southern maritime boundary follows coordinates marked by both Myanmar and Thailand towards the maritime tripoint with India's Andaman and Nicobar Islands. The maritime India-Myanmar border resumes end south of Coco Islands before heading towards Myanmar's narrow boundary with international Bay of Bengal waters.

Climate

Tropical monsoon in the lowlands below ; cloudy, rainy, hot, humid summers (southwest monsoon, June to September); less cloudy, scant rainfall, mild temperatures, lower humidity during winter (northeast monsoon, December to April).

Myanmar has three seasons: the cool and drier northeast monsoon running from late October to mid-February, the hot and dry intermonsoonal season from mid-February to mid-May and the rainy southwest monsoon from mid-May to late-October. Colloquially, they are called the winter, summer and rainy reasons respectively. The alternating mountain ranges and valleys create alternate zones of heavy and subdued precipitation during the monsoon season, with the majority of the country's precipitation coming from the southwest monsoons.

The higher elevations are subject to heavy snowfall, especially in the north. Distance from the sea also affects temperature and inland highlands can experience daily temperature ranges spanning 22'F (12'C) despite the tropical latitude.

Mountains

Myanmar's mountains create five distinct physiographic regions.

Northern Mountains

The Northern Mountains are characterised by complex ranges centred around the eastern ends of the Himalayas and the northeastern limit of the Indian-Australian Plate. The ranges at the southern end of the Hengduan System form the border between Myanmar and China. This mountain is part of a series of parallel ranges that run from the foothills of the Himalaya through the border areas with Assam, Nagaland and Mizoram.

Central Lowlands

Myanmar is characterized by its Central Lowlands running north-south between several different mountain ranges. This was deeply excavated by many rivers and today forms the basin for major rivers like the Irrawaddy, Chindwin and Sittaung Rivers. The Bago Yoma (Pegu Range) is a prominent but relatively low mountain chain between the Irrawaddy and the Sittaung River in lower-central Myanmar. Many smaller mountain ranges run through the lowlands like the small mountain ranges of Zeebyu Taungdan, Min-wun Taungdan, Hman-kin Taungdan and Gangaw Taungdan. Mount Popa, an extinct volcano and Nat worship holy site, rises prominently from the surrounding lowlands in these lowlands.

Western Ranges

The Western Ranges are characterized by the Arakan Mountains running from Manipur into western Myanmar southwards through Rakhine State almost to Cape Negrais in the shores of the Bay of Bengal in Ayeyarwady Region. The mountains reappear as the Andaman and Nicobar Islands further within the Andaman Sea. These mountains are old crystalline rocks separating the Arakan Coast from the rest of the country. The Arakan Range includes the Naga Hills, the Chin Hills, and the Patkai range which includes the Lushai Hills. The Arakan Coast of the Bay of Bengal lays west of these mountains with prominent island archipelagos and coral reefs.

Shan Plateau

In eastern Myanmar, the Shan Plateau rises abruptly from the central lowlands in single steps of some 2,000 feet (600m). The highest point of the Shan Hills is 2,563 m high Loi Pangnao, one of the ultra prominent peaks of Southeast Asia. The Shan Hills form, together with the Karen Hills, Dawna Range and Tenasserim Hills, a natural border with Thailand as well as the Kayah–Karen montane rain forests ecoregion which is included in the Global 200 list of ecoregions identified by the World Wildlife Fund (WWF) as priorities for conservation. The plateau was formed during the Mesozoic Era and are a much older feature than the other ranges of Myanmar, creating a series of elevated ranges and valleys. The most notable being the Salween River basin, covering 109,266 sq mi (283,00 sq km).

Southeastern Hills

Myanmar's Southeastern Hills and see the Tenasserim Plains have western shores backed by the Tenasserim Range respectively. The Tenessarim Plains consists largely of the western slopes of the Bilauktaung, the highest part of the Tenasserim Range, which extends southwards forming the central range of the Malay Peninsula. The Dawna Range also stretches along the northern parts of the Tenasserim tail of Myanmar. Many hills in this area, like Mount Zwegabin and Kyaiktiyo, are important cultural and religious sites. The coastal islands rise prominently from the sea and form multiple island archipelago with coral reefs, especially in the Mergui Archipelago.

Rivers

The Irrawaddy, the main river of Burma, flows from north to south through the Central Burma Basin and ends in a wide delta. The Mekong river runs from the Tibetan Plateau through China's Yunnan and northeastern Burma into Laos. The basin has significant mining resources and forest ecosystems. Its fertile delta also create 60% of annual rice harvests. The river is historically significant with the Bagan temples on their banks and the Kachin people's homeland near the river's source- the confluence of the N'mai and Mali rivers.

In the east the Salween and the Sittaung River run along the western side of the Shan Hills and the northern end of the Dawna Range. The Salween begins in China, where it is called the Nu River , and runs south through 17 degrees of latitude through the Shan Plateau. The Salween runs is called the angry river in Mandarin due to its fast running waters snaking through mountainous terrain for almost the entirety of its 1,491-mile (2,400 km) long length.
In the narrow southeastern part of Burma, the Ye, Heinze, Dawei (Tavoy), Great Tenasserim (Tanintharyi) and the Lenya rivers are relatively short and flow into the Andaman Sea. Further south the Kraburi River forms the southern border between Thailand and Burma.

Maritime claims

It includes more than 16 islands and the Mergui Archipelago.

Contiguous zone:

Continental shelf:
 or to the edge of the continental margin
Exclusive economic zone:
,

Islands

 Apaw-ye Kyun
 Calventuras Islands
 Cheduba Island
 Coco Islands
 Kaingthaung Island
 Kalegauk Island
 Kokunye Kyun
 Kyungyi Island
 Moscos Islands
 Myingun Island
 Nantha Kyun
 Preparis
 Ramree Island
 Unguan
 Wa Kyun
 Zalat Taung
 Mergui Archipelago
 Auriol Island
 Bentinck Kyun
 Christie Island, the southernmost island of the archipelago
 Kadan Kyun, the largest island of the archipelago
 Lanbi Kyun
 Letsok-aw Kyun
 Mali Kyun, the northernmost island of the archipelago
 Saganthit Kyun
 Than Kyun
 Thayawthadangyi
 Zadetkyi

Land use and natural resources

Since ancient times, Myanmar has been famous for its abundance of natural resources. The Sanskrit name Suvarnabhumi (သုဝဏ္ဏဘူမိ) has been used in relation to the area in modern-day Lower Burma and Thailand for millennia. Today, major resources include petroleum, natural gas, teak, other timber, tin, antimony, zinc, copper, tungsten, lead, coal, marble, limestone, jade, rubies, sapphire natural gas, and hydropower. Since 2010, Myanmar has had an explosion of foreign direct investment in the extractive sector. New large-scale infrastructure projects like the Kyaukphyu Pipeline and Myitsone Dam have caused controversy within the country, particularly in regard to China's role in the projects.

Natural hazards

Natural hazards include destructive earthquakes and cyclones. Flooding and landslides are common during the rainy season from June to September. Periodic droughts also occur.

Myanmar lies at the confluence of the Indian Plate, Eurasian Plate and the Burma microplate. Both the Indian-Eurasian subduction zone and the Indian-Burma plate boundaries are frequent hypocenters for earthquakes. The continental right-lateral transform Sagaing Fault responsible for many damaging earthquakes through the country's history like the 1839 Ava earthquake.

Myanmar is also hit by a powerful cyclone roughly every two years. The highest frequency of severe cyclones occur during November and May. The past century of cyclogenesis data in the North Indian Ocean has seen a significant increase in cyclone formation during these two months. The most damaging cyclone that hit Myanmar was the Cyclone Nargis in April–May 2008; with ongoing climate change, oceans will become warmer, which may lead to cyclones becoming more intense and devastating for Myanmar.

Environment

Environmental issues include deforestation; industrial pollution of air, soil, and water; inadequate sanitation and water treatment that contributes to disease. Climate change is also projected to have major impacts on Myanmar, such as increasing the prevalence and intensity of drought and extreme weather.

An IUCN Red List of Ecosystems Assessment was conducted for Myanmar in 2020 that assessed 64 terrestrial ecosystem types across 10 biomes. Of these 64 ecosystem types, 1 was confirmed as collapsed, 8 were considered Critically Endangered, 9 were considered Endangered, 12 were considered Vulnerable, 3 were considered Near Threatened, 14 were considered of Least Concern, and 17 were deemed Data Deficient. The 64 terrestrial ecosystem types included five brackish tidal systems, one dry subterranean system, one lake, five palustrine wetlands, four polar/alpine systems, twelve savannas and grasslands, two shoreline systems, two supralittoral coastal systems, seven temperate-boreal forests and woodlands, and twenty five tropical and subtropical forests.

A recent global remote sensing analysis suggested that there were 3,316 km² of tidal flats in Myanmar, making it the 8th ranked country in terms of tidal flat area.

Environment – international agreements
party to:
Biodiversity, Desertification, Endangered Species, Law of the Sea, Nuclear Test Ban, Ozone Layer Protection, Ship Pollution, Tropical Timber 83, Tropical Timber 94

See also

 List of rivers of Myanmar
 Geology of Myanmar
 List of volcanoes in Myanmar
 List of ecoregions in Myanmar
 Zomia (geography)

References

External links
 Myanmar Marine Biodiversity Atlas Online
 Ramsar – Burma
 Burma – Geography
 The Geology of Burma (Myanmar)